Madhav Prasad Birla (1918–1990) was an Indian entrepreneur based at Calcutta, West Bengal, India.

Biography 
He was born in Mumbai on 4 July 1918. He is the founder of M.P. Birla Group. He was married to Smt. Priyamvada Devi . He had set up a host of companies like Birla Corp, Universal Cables, Vindhya Telelinks, Hindustan Gum & Chemicals, Digvijay Woollen Mills, Indian Smelting. He also established Birla Planetarium & Belle Vue Clinic and several schools in Calcutta.
He also served as vice chairman of Bombay Hospital Trust.

He died on 30 July 1990 at Calcutta.

See also
Birla family
M. P. Birla Foundation Higher Secondary School

References

External links
Bio at Bombay Hospital page

Madhav Prasad
Rajasthani people
1918 births
1990 deaths
Founders of Indian schools and colleges
20th-century Indian philanthropists